Bideleh (also Romanized as Bīdeleh; also known as Bīdala) is a village in Manj Rural District of Manj District, Lordegan County, Chaharmahal and Bakhtiari province, Iran. At the 2006 census, its population was 1,721 in 368 households. The following census in 2011 counted 1,849 people in 457 households. The latest census in 2016 showed a population of 1,807 people in 480 households; it was the largest village in its rural district. The village is populated by Lurs.

References 

Lordegan County

Populated places in Chaharmahal and Bakhtiari Province

Populated places in Lordegan County

Luri settlements in Chaharmahal and Bakhtiari Province